Seven Second Surgery is the debut album by Canadian pop punk band Faber Drive. It was released on May 1, 2007, under 604 Records. The songs "24 Story Love Affair" and "Sex and Love" from the band's EP Faber were also added to the album. Seven Second Surgery garnered positive reviews from critics, who praised the production and the band's musicianship but questioned their longevity in an oversaturated market. The album spawned four singles: "Second Chance", "Tongue Tied", "When I'm with You", and "Sleepless Nights (Never Let Her Go)".

Critical reception

Seven Second Surgery received positive reviews from music critics praising the production and musicianship from both the producers and the band but were unsure of how the latter would last long-term. Jo-Ann Greene of AllMusic gave high praise to the album's well-crafted production and the band's musicianship for paying nods to their musical influences while delivering them with tenacious energy, concluding with, "Powerful playing, strong melodies, irrepressible choruses, and a stunning sound belie this album's title – with no quick fix to be found, this set was lovingly operated on over time and built to last." A writer from Alternative Addiction also gave praise to the production and lyrical work of Brian Howes mixing well with the band in a pop punk environment, despite some surface-only lyrics and stale genre material towards the end, calling the album "a sensational collection of bubble gum pop tunes that become instantly embedded in the brain, however band longevity means song longevity and with the next album the band should look to evolve into something a little less instant and with a clear plan to leave a longer lasting taste on the aural palate."

A writer from TuneLab praised the album's collection of pop rock lyrics with various emotions being delivered by a capable and talented band but felt the material was more Kroeger and Howes with the band included and it was interchangeable with other similar albums, concluding that "Seven Second Surgery may not be groundbreaking, earth shattering, or for that matter original, but it is not a shitty album on the whole. In order to enjoy the album, one must bury the fact that this is stereotypical radio rock and just enjoy the album for what it is-fun, upbeat, catchy, and a quick fix." Chris Fallon of AbsolutePunk commended the band's effort to deliver upbeat and catchy pop punk material but found the lyrics generic and the catchability in the hooks and melodies lacking in staying power like the rest of the album, concluding that, "We all enjoy candy every now and then, and that is exactly what Faber Drive's Seven Second Surgery is: a roll of Shock Tarts that leaves your tastebuds on high-alert and keeps your mind buzzing, but eventually, drains you and leaves you feeling vacant."

Track listing

Bonus track
<li>"(I Just) Died in Your Arms Tonight"
Found in limited quantities of the album with free Faber Drive Tunecardz featuring this song.

Personnel
Adapted from the Seven Second Surgery media notes.

Faber Drive
 Faber – Lead Vox/Guitar
 David Joshua Hinsley – Guitar/Vox
 Krikit – Bass/Vox
 Red Bull – Drums/Vox

Additional musicians
 Brian Howes
 Daniel Adair
 Robin Diaz
 Pat Steward
 Lance LaPointe
 Tommy Walter
 Scotty-Win
 Mile Foxx Hill
 Ryan Van Poederooyen

Production
 Brian Howes – Producer (Mountainview Studios, Abbotsford B.C.)
 Joey Moi – Engineering, Mixing (Mountainview Studios, Abbotsford B.C.), Producer
 Scott Cooke (Scotty Win) – Assistant, Digital Editing
 Jay Van Poederooyen – Digital Editing
 Ryan Anderson, Alex Aligizakis – Additional Editing and Assisting
 Ted Jensen – Mastering
 Jaclyn Roste – Runner
 Chad Kroeger – Additional Production

Miscellaneous
 Sandy Brummels – Creative Director
 Christopher Kornmann – Art Direction & Design (Spit and Image)
 Doug Cunningham – Cover Illustration (Morning Breath)
 Marina Chavez – Photography
 Jon Minson – Logo
 Paul and Isabelle – Styling

References

2007 debut albums
604 Records albums
Faber Drive albums